Fat Jack's Comicrypt or Fat Jack's is a comic book store with locations in Philadelphia, Pennsylvania and Oaklyn, New Jersey. The Philadelphia store, located at 2006 Sansom Street, was founded by Mike Ferraro in 1976. It is the oldest comic book store in Philadelphia and one of the ten oldest comic book stores in the United States.

References 

Comics retailers
Retail companies established in 1976